Pygolampis is a genus of assassin bugs in the family Reduviidae. Five species have been described from Vietnam, and at least eleven worldwide.

species
 Pygolampis angusta Hsiao, 1977 v
 Pygolampis bidentata (Goeze, 1778) i c g
 Pygolampis blandus Jacquelin du Val g
 Pygolampis foeda Stål, 1859 v
 Pygolampis matogrossensis Costa Lima & Campos Seabra, 1945 g
 Pygolampis pectoralis (Say, 1832) i c g b
 Pygolampis rufescens Hsiao, 1977 v
 Pygolampis sericea Stål, 1859 i c g b
 Pygolampis simulipes Hsiao, 1977 v
 Pygolampis spurca Stål, 1859 g
 Pygolampis tuberosa 2003 v
Data sources: i = ITIS, c = Catalogue of Life, g = GBIF, b = Bugguide.net v = Vietnam

References

Reduviidae
Fauna of Vietnam